Samuel Cole Sloman (born September 19, 1997) is an American football placekicker who is a free agent. He played college football at Miami University, and in 2019 he made 86.7% of his field goal attempts (leading all kickers in the nation). He was selected in the seventh round (248th overall) of the 2020 NFL Draft by the Los Angeles Rams, and has also played for the Tennessee Titans.

Early life
His parents are Jay and Judi Sloman. Sloman's hometown is Roswell, Georgia.

For high school, Sloman attended Pace Academy ('16), in the Buckhead area of Atlanta, Georgia. He earned two letters in football, and four letters in soccer. He did not start to play football until he was a junior. As a senior in football he connected on 20-of-23 kicks, with a long of 53 yards, and also nailed all 51 extra points.  He was a two-time All-State kicker, and a 2015 MaxPreps First Team All-American.

College career

Sloman attended Miami University in Ohio ('20), majoring in kinesiology. During his career with the Miami Redhawks football team, Sloman completed 49 of his 62 field goal attempts for 79%. On extra point attempts, he made 112-for-115 for 97.4%. During his senior year in 2019, he made 86.7% of his field goal attempts (leading his conference, and leading all kickers in the country with 30 or more attempts), went 11-for-14 from beyond 40 yards and was 4-for-5 on field goal attempts longer than 50 yards (with a long of 53 yards).

Sloman earned Second-Team All-MAC honors, and was named Second-Team All-America by The Athletic.  He ranks second in field goals (49) and extra points (112) and third in percentage (.790) all-time for Miami. Lance Zierlein of nfl.com described him as: "Stocky with plenty of fire in his belly." Sloman is Jewish, and his teammates nicknamed him the "Kosher Cannon."

Professional career

Los Angeles Rams
Sloman was drafted by the Los Angeles Rams with the 248th pick in the seventh round of the 2020 NFL Draft, even though kickers are rarely selected in the NFL Draft. The Rams were impressed by his past performance in the clutch, with Rams senior personnel executive Brian Xanders noting: "In the second half or overtime during the last two years, he went 27 out of 29. So when the score is tight or it’s getting close to the end of the game, he’s been clutch." Xanders added that he liked Sloman's angle of approach, similar to a powerful golf swing, and "he's gotten better every year [...] He's a powerful guy, he's a weather kicker, and he's a competitor. He just wants to take everybody's job." Sloman was the first Miami University kicker to be drafted in the NFL, and its 40th player.

On July 28, he signed a four-year, $3.37 million contract. He was named the Rams' starting kicker, beating out fellow rookies Lirim Hajrullahu and Austin MacGinnis. Asked whether he was nervous about kicking in front of no fans at SoFi Stadium, he said: "It's not going to be weird for me not having fans at the games. I played plenty of games in college [at Miami] with not many people there." After playing in the team's first seven games, Sloman was waived on October 27. He had converted 8-of-11 field goal attempts, with a long of 42, and was 18-for-21 on extra point attempts.

Tennessee Titans
On November 24, 2020, Sloman was signed to the Tennessee Titans' practice squad. Following an injury to Stephen Gostkowski, he was elevated to the active roster on January 2, 2021, for the team's week 17 game against the Houston Texans, and reverted to the practice squad after the game. He hit all five extra point attempts and both field goals, including the game-winner that deflected off the right upright from 37 yards away as time expired, with which the Titans won the AFC South division. He was released on January 12.

Pittsburgh Steelers
On July 1, 2021, the Pittsburgh Steelers signed Sloman to a one-year deal. He was waived on August 17, 2021. He re-signed to their practice squad on November 27, 2021. He signed a reserve/future contract with the Steelers on January 18, 2022. He was waived on May 16, 2022.

San Francisco 49ers
On October 12, 2022, Sloman was signed to the San Francisco 49ers practice squad. He was released on October 18.

NFL career statistics

|-style="text-align:center;"
! rowspan="2"|2020 !! LAR
| 7 || 8 || 11 || 72.7 || 3 || 42 || 18 || 21 || 85.7 || 37 || 64.5 || 22 || 42
|- style="text-align:center;"
! TEN
| 1 || 2 || 2 || 100.0 || 0 || 47 || 5 || 5 || 100.0 || 0 || 0 || 0 || 11
|-
! colspan="2"| Career !! 8 !! 10 !! 13 !! 76.9 !! 3 !! 47 !! 23 !! 26 !! 88.6 !! 37 !! 64.5 !! 22 !! 53
|}

See also
List of select Jewish football players

References

External links
Twitter page
Los Angeles Rams bio
Miami RedHawks bio
"Sam Sloman: Have to Focus on Doing Your Job," January 3, 2021 (video)

1997 births
Living people
People from Roswell, Georgia
Players of American football from Georgia (U.S. state)
Jewish American sportspeople
American football placekickers
Miami RedHawks football players
Los Angeles Rams players
Tennessee Titans players
Pittsburgh Steelers players
21st-century American Jews
San Francisco 49ers players